Ziborovka is a rural locality (a selo) in Shebekinsky District, Belgorod Oblast, Russia. The population was 329 as of 2010. There are six streets.

Geography 
Ziborovka is located 31 km southwest of Shebekino (the district's administrative centre) by road. Nechayevka is the nearest rural locality.

References 

Rural localities in Shebekinsky District